Marcia Gail Cooke (October 16, 1954 – January 27, 2023) was an American lawyer who served as a United States district judge of the United States District Court for the Southern District of Florida.

Early life and education
Cooke was born in 1954 in Sumter, South Carolina. She graduated from the Edmund A. Walsh School of Foreign Service at Georgetown University with a Bachelor of Science in Foreign Service in 1975 and from Wayne State University Law School with a Juris Doctor in 1977.

Legal career
Cooke was a staff attorney for Neighborhood Legal Services in Michigan from 1978 to 1979 and was a deputy public defender of the Legal Aid and Defender Association in Michigan from 1979-1980. Cooke served as an Assistant U.S. Attorney for the Eastern District of Michigan from 1980 to 1983. From 1983 to 1984 Cooke was in private practice in Michigan with the firm of Miro, Miro and Weiner. Cooke served as a United States magistrate judge of the United States District Court for the Eastern District of Michigan from 1984 to 1992.

In 1992 Cooke served as director of professional development and training at the U.S. Attorney's Office for the Southern District of Florida. From 1992 to 1994 she was the Executive Assistant U.S. Attorney for the Southern District of Florida, before returning to her director of professional development and training from 1994 to 1999. Cooke served as chief inspector general for the Executive Office of the Governor of Florida under Jeb Bush from 1999 to 2002. From 2002 to 2004 she was assistant county attorney in Miami-Dade County.

Federal judicial career
President George W. Bush nominated Cooke to the United States District Court for the Southern District of Florida on November 25, 2003, to the seat vacated by Wilkie D. Ferguson. She was confirmed by the Senate on May 18, 2004 by a vote of 96-0. Cooke received her commission the same day. She is the first black woman federal judge in Florida. She assumed senior status on July 15, 2022, due to health concerns.

Judge Cooke presided over the trials of José Padilla in 2007, and his re-sentencing in 2014.

Personal life and death 
Cooke was Catholic.

Judge Cooke died in Detroit on January 27, 2023, at the age of 68. She had inoperable cancer, and her health had further declined in 2022 after a pulmonary embolism.

See also
List of African-American federal judges
List of African-American jurists

References

Sources

1954 births
2023 deaths
21st-century American judges
21st-century American women judges
African-American Catholics
African-American judges
African-American lawyers
African-American women lawyers
American women lawyers
Assistant United States Attorneys
Deaths from cancer in Michigan
Judges of the United States District Court for the Southern District of Florida
Michigan lawyers
People from Sumter, South Carolina
Public defenders
United States district court judges appointed by George W. Bush
United States magistrate judges
Walsh School of Foreign Service alumni
Wayne State University Law School alumni